The VPK-3927 Volk (English: "Wolf") is a Russian 4×4 multipurpose military armoured vehicle, manufactured by Military Industrial Company. The Volk family developed modifying a previous model by Military Industrial Company, the Tigr.

History
The Volk debuted during the International Forum Engineering Technologies 2010 (IDELF-2010) from 30 June to 4 July 2010 in Zhukovsky, Russia. The first 20 vehicles were delivered in 2022.

Volk-produced armoured vehicles with 1.5-ton and 2.5-ton capacities were developed to comply with the needs of the Russian military and police. They incorporate modular design principles as to assist with existing and future domestic serial production.

Volk's armoured vehicles family consists of three groups: armoured, unarmoured and commercial civilian cars. The first group of armoured vehicles is currently in the testing phase, the other groups are under development. The group of armoured vehicles includes the basic VPK-3927 which consists of a protected cabin and separate armoured functional back module, the VPK-39271 which has a whole protected functional module joint with cabin, the VPK-39272 which is designed to transport cargo and personnel with the ability for installation of various functional modules, and the VPK-39273 6x6 vehicle which has a protected cabin and separate functional rear module.

Design

There are several new designs applied on Volk armoured vehicles: a unified platform, independent hydro-pneumatic suspension with height adjustment, enhanced protection of cabin, a new diesel engine YaMZ-5347, onboard information control system (BIUS), and a modular design.

The conception of protection for vehicles is based on the provision of the highest ballistic and mine protection of vehicles and personnel. The design of frame-panel armour provides its assembly and disassembly in field conditions without the use of special tools. Ballistic protection is STANAG 4569 level 3 with the possibility of increasing the level. Mine protection is 1 level (2 after upgrade).

Volk vehicles have the advanced diesel engine YaMZ-5347 Euro-4. The engine has modernization reserve for power up to 300 hp. The transmission and transfer gearbox provides a resource of 250 thousand km with engine power of 240 hp.

Independent hydropneumatic suspension with height adjustment allows the driver to change the ground clearance from 250mm to 500mm and move off-road at speeds of up to 55–60 km/h.

The angle of the front and rear overhang varies depending on the position of the suspension from 45 to 55 degrees. The minimum turn radius is 7 m.

The unification of the vehicles includes unified power units, cabins, suspension, transmission, onboard information control system and protection features. The internal volume of the cabin is 2.4 cubic meters, the functional module of the VPK-3927 vehicle is 4.7 cubic meters, the VPK-39271 mono space module is 7.2 cubic meters, and the volume of the VPK-39273 6x6 module is 10.3 cubic meters.

The Onboard Information Control System (BIUS) provides a control function and diagnosis of basic units and components of vehicles with a record of their parameters. The engine is controlled by 15 parameters: pressure, temperature, speed, fuel supply, cooling system, lubricating system, etc. Transmission and tires are controlled by temperature and pressure. The hydraulic and suspension adjustment system is controlled in 24 points. Malfunction of BIUS is not connected with the mobility of the vehicle.

Variants
 VPK-3927 Volk — basic vehicle with protected cabin and separate armoured functional back module.
 VPK-39271 Volk — armoured vehicle with a whole protected functional module joint with cabin.
 VPK-39272 Volk-2 — cargo and personnel transport vehicle with the ability for installation of various functional modules. This version of the Volk vehicle allows the use of a wide variety of functional modules, such as medic, jamming, signal or logistics modules.

 VPK-39273 Volk-3 — 6x6 vehicle with protected cabin and separate functional rear module.

 MIC-39274 "Volk-4"  — 6x6 MRAP

Current operators
 
  (One VPK-Ural has been captured from Russian forces during the 2022 Russian invasion of Ukraine)

See also

Similar vehicles
GAZ-2975
Didgori-2
Tiuna
Mowag Eagle
ATF Dingo
Humvee
URO VAMTAC
Iveco LMV

References

External links
 http://vitalykuzmin.net/?q=node/316
 Military Industrial Company official website
 VPK-39271 "Volk-I" Walkaround
 VPK-39272 "Volk-II" Walkaround

Off-road vehicles
Military Industrial Company military vehicles
Military trucks
Military vehicles of Russia
Military light utility vehicles
Military vehicles introduced in the 2010s